Lakeview Historic District is a national historic district located at Lakeview, Moore County, North Carolina. The district encompasses 43 contributing buildings, 1 contributing site, and 3  contributing structures in the early-20th century resort town of Lakeview.  It was developed between the 1903 and 1940 and includes notable examples of Queen Anne and Classical Revival style architecture.  Notable buildings include the Gardner House, Burr House, B. D. Usshur House (c. 1903), Newcomb-McFayden House (c. 1905), "Afterglow" (c. 1920), and the Lakeview Presbyterian Church (1907).

It was added to the National Register of Historic Places in 2000.

References

Historic districts on the National Register of Historic Places in North Carolina
Neoclassical architecture in North Carolina
Queen Anne architecture in North Carolina
Buildings and structures in Moore County, North Carolina
National Register of Historic Places in Moore County, North Carolina